Harry Elliott Alger (April 8, 1924 – January 27, 2010) was a provincial level politician from Alberta, Canada. He served as a Member of the Alberta Legislature from 1982 until 1989.

Political career
Alger was first elected to the Legislative Assembly of Alberta in the 1982 Alberta general election. He defeated Western Canada Concept leader and Incumbent Gordon Kesler and four other candidates in a high-profile race to win his first term in office. He held the district for the Progressive Conservatives,  succeeding fellow PC member George Wolstenholme in a safe district. Alger was re-elected to his second term and final term in office with a greatly reduced plurality in the 1986 Alberta general election. He defeated five other candidates to win easily. He retired at dissolution of the Legislature in 1989. He died in 2010 at the age of 85.

References

External links
Legislative Assembly of Alberta Members Listing

Progressive Conservative Association of Alberta MLAs
1924 births
2010 deaths